is a former Japanese football player.

Playing career
Niimura was born in Numazu on May 11, 1970. After graduating from Kokushikan University, he joined JEF United Ichihara in 1993. He played many matches as forward from first season. In 1997, he moved to Japan Football League (JFL) club Consadole Sapporo. The club won the champions in 1997 and was promoted to J1 League end of the season. However he moved to JFL club Jatco in 1998. Although he played in 6 seasons, the club was disbanded end of 2003 season.

Club statistics

References

External links

1970 births
Living people
Kokushikan University alumni
Association football people from Shizuoka Prefecture
Japanese footballers
J1 League players
Japan Football League (1992–1998) players
Japan Football League players
JEF United Chiba players
Hokkaido Consadole Sapporo players
Jatco SC players
Association football forwards